Old Dogs was an American country music supergroup composed of singers Waylon Jennings, Mel Tillis, Bobby Bare, and Jerry Reed. Signed in 1998 to Atlantic Records, Old Dogs recorded a self-titled studio album for the label that year. The album's content was written primarily by author, poet, and songwriter Shel Silverstein. Most of the group's songs were based on the realization of aging, after Bare told Silverstein that there were "no good songs about growing old." The album was recorded live in studio, so audience applause can be heard between the tracks. The two discs come in different cases, and has different album art for them. The album was also issued as a single disc. "Still Gonna Die" was released as a single from the project. The album was one of the last projects Silverstein completed in his lifetime; he died in May 1999, five months after the album was released.

Old Dogs (1998)

Track listing
All songs written by Shel Silverstein; "She'd Rather Be Homeless", co-written by Anne Dailey.

Disc 1
 "Old Dogs" - 2:21
 "Come Back When You're Younger" - 3:35
 "I Don't Do It No More" - 3:41
 "She'd Rather Be Homeless" - 3:59
 "Cut the Mustard" - 3:25
 "Young Man's Job" - 3:08
 "When I Was" - 2:07
 "Couch Potato" - 3:44
 "Hard When It Ain't" - 2:41
 "Jittabug" - 2:58
 "Me and Jimmie Rodgers" - 4:56

Disc 2
 "Elvis Has Left the Building" - 2:55
 "Wait Until Tomorrow" - 3:16
 "I Never Expected" - 3:23
 "Ever Lovin' Machine" - 3:12
 "Slap My Face" - 2:30
 "Old Man Blues" - 3:45
 "Rough on the Livin'" - 2:53
 "Alimony" - 3:33
 "Still Gonna Die" - 3:45
 "Time" - 3:34

Single-disc version
"Old Dogs"
"I Don't Do It No More"
"She'd Rather Be Homeless"
"Cut the Mustard"
"Young Man's Job"
"Me and Jimmie Rodgers"
"Elvis Has Left the Building"
"Rough on the Livin'"
"Still Gonna Die"
"I Never Expected"
"Time"

Credits
 Waylon Jennings - Vocals
 Mel Tillis - Vocals
 Bobby Bare - Vocals
 Jerry Reed - Vocals, Guitar
 Pete Wade - Electric guitar
 Thom Bresh - Guitar
 Mike Leech - Bass
 Fred Newell - Guitar, Steel guitar
 Bobby Emmons - Electronic keyboard
 Jamey Whiting - Keyboard
 Hargus "Pig" Robbins - Piano
 Jay Vern - Organ
 Eddy Anderson - Drums
 Michael Clarke - Drums
 Jonathan Yudkin - Fiddle
 Ron De La Vega - Cello
 David L. Schnaufer - Jew's Harp
 Gary Kubal - Percussion
 Robert Lovett - Bass, Dobro
 Jessi Colter - Backing vocals
 Shel Silverstein - Backing vocals
 Bobby Bare Jr. - Backing vocals

Chart performance

Singles

References

External links

 Mel Tillis' Official Website

American country music groups
Atlantic Records artists
Musical quartets
American supergroups
Musical groups established in 1998
Country music supergroups